The International Federation of Associations of Classical Studies (FIEC), or Fédération internationale des associations d'études classiques (FIEC) (in French, which is its other official language) is an international association of Classical Studies associations all over the world. It encompasses national and international associations promoting the development of Classical philology, Latin, Ancient Greek, Classical archaeology, papyrology, paleography, epigraphy, numismatics, among other subjects. It was founded in Paris in 1948 at the UNESCO, where its associated journal, L'Année philologique, was also based. It currently has members in 46 countries, encompassing more than 60 national and regional associations and 14 international organizations of classical studies.

History 
An international network of classicists was being tentatively assembled just before the Second World War. In 1948, Juliette Ernst and Jules Marouzeau (from L'Année philologique) fond support in UNESCO, in Paris, which offered funding and logistical support from organizations such as the International Academic Union or the International Council of Philosophy and Human Sciences (ICPHS).

The founding assembly was held on 28 and 29 September 1948 at UNESCO. The first president was classical philologist Danish Carsten Høeg. Largely French at first, the FIEC became also more Anglophone from the 1980s.

Its seat is established in the city where the secretary resides. The Secretary General in 2019 is Professor Sabine R. Huebner, from the University of Basel. The latest FIEC International Congress was held in London in 2019, with the support of the three British associations: Society for the Promotion of Hellenic Studies, Society for the Promotion of Roman Studies, and The Classical Association. The next meeting will be held in 2022 in Mexico City, the congress after that in 2025 in Wrocław (Poland).

Founding members
 Société d'Études Latines de Bruxelles (Belgium)
 American Philological Association (USA)
 Association Guillaume-Budé (France)
 Association pour l’encouragement des études grecques en France (France)
 Société des études latines (France)
 Société internationale de bibliographie classique (France)
 Classical Association (UK)
 The Society for the Promotion of Hellenic Studies (UK)
 The Society for the Promotion of Roman Studies (UK)
 Classical Association of Scotland (Scotland)
 Nederlands Klassiek Verbond (The Netherlands)
 Polskie Towarzystwo Filologiczne (Poland)
 Dansk Selskab for Oldtids-og Middelalderforskning (Danemark)
 Filologisk-Historiske Samfund (Danemark)
 Svenska Klassikerförbundet (Sweden)

List of members 

 Classical Association of South Africa (South Africa)
Deutsche Altphilologenverband (Germany)
Mommsen-Gesellschaft (Germany)
Sodalitas (Austria)
Bundesarbeitsgemeinschaft Klassischer Philologen (Austria)
Société d'études latines de Bruxelles (Belgium)
Sociedade Brasileira de Estudos Clássicos (Brazil)
Parnassos Literary Society (Greece)
Philologos (Greece)
Scientific Society of Athens (Greece)
Associazione Italiana di Cultura Classica (Italy)
Centro di studi ciceroniani (Italy)
International Plutarch Society - Sezione italiana (Italy)
Società italiana per lo studio dell’ antichità classica (Italy)
Schweizerische Vereinigung für Altertumswissenschaft (Switzerland)
Groupe romand des études grecques et latines (Switzerland).
Turkish Institute of Archaeology (Turkey)

Additional members 

 Association internationale d'épigraphie grecque et latine (AIEGL)
 Association internationale d'études patristiques / International Association of Patristic Studies (AIEP)
 Association internationale de papyrologues (AIP)
 Association internationale des études byzantines / International Association of Byzantine Studies (AIEB)
 Association Internationale des Etudes Néo-Latines / International Association For Neo-Latin Studies (Societas Internationalis Studiis Neolatinis Provehendis)
 Association pour l'étude de l'Antiquité tardive (APAT)
 Associazione Internazionale di Archeologia Classica (AIAC)
 Centro Internazionale per lo Studio dei Papiri Ercolanesi Marcello Gigante (CISPE)
 Comité international permanent des études mycéniennes (CIPEM)
 Fondation Hardt pour l’Étude de l’Antiquité Classique
 International Association "Geography And Historiography In Antiquity" (GAHIA)
 International Plato Society (IPS)
 Société internationale de bibliographie classique (SIBC)
 Société internationale pour l'histoire des droits de l'Antiquité (SIHDA)
 Thesaurus Linguae Latinae (TLL)

Presidents 

 1948–1951: Carsten Høeg
 1951–1954: Ronald Syme
 1954–1959: Bernard Abraham van Groningen
 1959–1964: Pietro Romanelli
 1964–1969: Dag Norberg
 1969–1974: Marcel Durry
 1974–1979: Dionisie M. Pippidi
 1979–1980: 
 1982–1984: William H. Willis
 1984–1989: Emilio Gabba
 1989–1994: Jean Irigoin
 1994–1997: John Boardman
 1997–2004: Carl Joachim Classen
 2004–2009: Heinrich von Staden
 2009–2014: Averil Cameron
 2014-2019: 
 2019-2022: Gunhild Vidén

General secretaries 
 1948-1953 Charles Dugas
 1953-1974 Juliette Ernst
 1974-2004 François Paschoud
 2004-2019 Paul Schubert
 2019–present Sabine R. Huebner

FIEC-Congresses 
 1950: Paris (France)
 1954: Copenhagen (Denmark)
 1959: London (Great Britain)
 1964: Philadelphia (USA)
 1969: Bonn (Germany)
 1974: Madrid (Spain)
 1979: Budapest (Hungary)
 1984: Dublin (Ireland)
 1989: Pisa (Italy)
 1994: Quebec (Canada)
 1999: Kavalla (Greece)
 2004: Ouro Preto (Brasil)
 2009: Berlin (Germany)
 2014: Bordeaux (France)
 2019: London (Great Britain)
 2022: Mexico-City (Mexico)
 2025: Wrocław (Poland)

References

External links 
   Official Website of the FIEC – International Federation of Associations of Classical Studies

Research organisations in France